BAB AL QASR which literally means “door of the palace”, is a five star hotel located on the west end of Abu Dhabi, the capital of United Arab Emirates. The hotel opened at the end of 2016.

References

External links 
 Bab al-Qasr at Constructionweek Online

Residential skyscrapers in Abu Dhabi
Skyscraper hotels in Abu Dhabi
2012 establishments in the United Arab Emirates
Hotels established in 2012
Hotel buildings completed in 2012